Italy competed at the 2019 IAAF World Relays in Yokohama, Japan, from 11–19 May 2019.

Selected athletes
29 athletes, 14 men and 15 women, was selected for the event.

Men

4x100
Federico Cattaneo
Eseosa Desalu
Marcell Jacobs
Davide Manenti
Roberto Rigali
Filippo Tortu

4x400/4x400 mixed
Vladimir Aceti
Daniele Corsa
Andrew Howe
Giuseppe Leonardi
Davide Re
Edoardo Scotti
Alessandro Sibilio
Michele Tricca

Women

4x100
Anna Bongiorni
Zaynab Dosso
Johanelis Herrera Abreu
Gloria Hooper
Alessia Pavese
Irene Siragusa

4x400/4x400 mixed
Chiara Bazzoni
Rebecca Borga
Maria Benedicta Chigbolu
Ayomide Folorunso
Raphaela B. Lukudo
Marta Milani
Giancarla D. Trevisan
Virginia Troiani
Elisabetta Vandi

Composition team and results
On 10 May 2019 Italian Athletics Federation announced the composition of the five national teams to the five competitions in which it will participate.

See also
Italian national track relay team

References

External links
IAAF World Relays Yokohama 2019

2019
2019 IAAF World Relays
World Athletics Relays